Rangel Gerovski (15 January 1959 – 26 April 2004) was a Bulgarian wrestler who competed in the 1988 Summer Olympics and in the 1992 Summer Olympics.

References

External links
 

1959 births
2004 deaths
Olympic wrestlers of Bulgaria
Wrestlers at the 1988 Summer Olympics
Wrestlers at the 1992 Summer Olympics
Bulgarian male sport wrestlers
Olympic silver medalists for Bulgaria
Olympic medalists in wrestling
People from Karlovo
Medalists at the 1988 Summer Olympics
20th-century Bulgarian people
21st-century Bulgarian people